The Federal District Metro (Portuguese: Metrô do Distrito Federal, commonly called Metrô DF) is the rapid transit system of the Federal District, in Brazil. It is operated by Companhia do Metropolitano do Distrito Federal and was opened in 2001.

The metro covers the Federal District's main cities at west. Its main problem is the sheer distance between many stations (caused by overall low density, suburban profile for such system), making it only a small part of the transit system of the Federal District and mostly an intercity service, with exceptions in Brasília and Ceilândia. The administrative region of Águas Claras is well-served by the system, making it one of the fastest-growing areas of the Federal District and the most dense.

All this is possible thanks to the Signaling and Traffic Control and Automatic Protection System for Trains, which allow the regularity of the interval between trips, speed control and control of the distance between the trains. Electrical, communication and signalling systems work in a redundant way; i.e. if there are flaws in the main system, the second is immediately started. The whole system takes corrective and preventive maintenance daily.

History 
The construction of the Federal District Metro began in 1992, and its first sections started operating in 1999, but because of a backlog of work, the metro was not opened at its originally-scheduled date and time (21 April 1994 at 17:00). Work was finally finished in the beginning of 2001, and commercial service began on 24 September of that year.

Five more stations were opened in 2008: 108 South, Guariroba, Downtown Ceilândia, North Ceilândia and Ceilândia.

102 South and 112 South stations opened in 2009; Guará station opened in 2010.

Operations 
It operates from 06:00 to 23:30 Mondays to Saturdays, from 07:00 to 19:00 on Sundays. Its stations are equipped with stairs and lifts.

Tickets and fares 
The access to Metrô-DF is controlled by electronic entry and exit barriers. To travel on the metro, tickets are unitary, for a single trip, or by a magnetic card, which is inserted into the ticket barriers. The card can be recharged.

Lines 

The Green and Orange Lines both begin at the Central station, under the Pilot Plan Bus Station in the centre of Brasília and run parallel up until the Águas Claras station. The Orange Line goes south to Samambaia. The Green Line follows to Ceilândia. The metro runs underground in Brasília (exception at Asa Sul station) and through the Central Sector of Taguatinga, at Praça do Relógio station. Elsewhere, it runs on the surface.

Technical 
The supervision and control of the operation, which includes the subsystems of traffic, energy, and telecommunications, are run by the Operational Control Center (OCC), considered the brains of the Metro-DF. The control is fully computerized. Qualified professionals constantly monitor all train movements.

All is done with the help of sensors installed along the tracks and an optical fiber communication system. The system allows reception and transmission of information between the OCC and the other components of the metro system, such as trains, stations and substations. The center receives real-time information on route speeds, time spent at stations, passenger flow, and energy supply routes.

The electricity used by the Metro-DF is supplied by Companhia Energética de Brasília (CEB), directly from Furnas. It arrives at 13,800 V alternating current and is transformed by power rectifier substations along the lines of Metro-DF.

The rectifier substations distribute 13,800 V for passenger stations, which is stepped down to 380/220 V to feed the equipment. The trains' traction systems are fed by 750 V. The electric current is sent to the third rail and is collected by shoes located on the sides of trains, providing power to their motors.

Any movement of trains on the lines and yards, signaling systems, and auxiliary energy distribution function is under the command of the Operational Control Center (OCC). In exceptional situations, the OCC, in touch with teams of technicians and agents in metro stations and courts, uses this system to convey the necessary steps to determine alternative routes for trains.

Rolling stock 

Its increasing use indicated the need to expand the original fleet of 20 four–car Alstom Metropolis trainsets. To deal with the increasing demand, 12 new four–car trainsets were purchased from Alstom, with the first arriving in the Federal District in June 2010, leading to a fleet of 32 trains in total.

All trains go through a period of engagement and dynamic tests, where all components of traction, braking, signaling and communication will be assessed. Therefore, it takes 30 days for effective operation of new cars. The new fleet incorporates a number of advanced technologies including a modern drive system, which reduces the technical flaws of trains and reduce the waiting time at stations. Before the Alstom trains were put into operation, the Federal District Metro carried about 160,000 passengers per day.

With the new Alstom Metropolis trainsets in operation, the Federal District Metro's headways can be reduced from four and a half minutes to three minutes, and its capacity will nearly double to 300,000 passengers per day. , all 12 of the new trainsets had been delivered and were in service. The Federal District Metro invested a total of R$ 325 million for the purchase of the new trains, modernizing the aging fleet, and purchasing spare parts. R$260 million was financed by BNDES, with the remainder being paid by the federal government.

Expansion plans

In 2009, the originally-planned first stage of the new transport system in the Federal District was inaugurated. It is one of three sections provided for in an online project to integrate a set of measures developed by the Government of the Federal District to revitalize the W3. The complete light rail line route would link rail Terminal North to the Brasília International Airport.

This original Terminal South stretch was planned to be ready for the 2014 FIFA World Cup. Work on this first phase started in 2009, under the Company's management of the Federal District Metro. However, work on the line was suspended in April 2011 because of a fraudulent billing process, and the line was not ready for the 2014 FIFA World Cup, but it is still included in longer-term planning.

The line is planned to use mild electrical energy, which contributes to reducing greenhouse gas emissions and noise sounds. For most of the line, electricity will come from poles and wires along the track. In the area between 502 South and 502 North, the energy will be collected through a third rail, as required by the Institute of Historical and Artistic Heritage (Iphan). The route, along W3 Sul, is one of the busiest of the city is 60,000 cars per day and 800 buses. About 150 bus routes run through the W3 South, and the light rail line was planned to carry between 15,000 and 18,000 passengers per hour in both directions.

Taking the example of the Metro system, the Metropolitan Company of the Federal District expects at least 30% of motorists leave their cars at home and start using the new line rail line. A new impetus in the local market will be a consequence of changes in the way of urban W3.

The more recent priority for the line rail line project was a planned , 7-station section including the section between rail Terminal South and the Brasília International Airport. The section was budgeted at R$276.9 million. The light rail line project was restarted, with the bidding process on the section from 2013.

Network Map

See also 
 List of metro systems
 Rapid transit in Brazil

References

Metro
Rapid transit in Brazil
Underground rapid transit in Brazil
Electric railways in Brazil
5 ft 3 in gauge railways in Brazil